Ngwanallela (formerly called Ambergate) is a village in Ga-Matlala in the Blouberg Local Municipality of the Capricorn District Municipality of the Limpopo province of South Africa. It is located about 19 km northwest of Tibane and 40 km east of Steilloopbrug.

Education 
 Ambergate Primary School
 Ngwanallela High School

Sports 
 Masea F.C.
 Ngwanallela All-Stars F.C.
 Magoši F.C.

References 

Populated places in the Blouberg Local Municipality